Weitbrecht Communications, Inc. (WCI) is a Santa Monica, California company that specializes in providing products for deaf people. The company was founded as Applied Communications around 1965 by Robert Weitbrecht and James C. Marsters based on Weitbrecht's invention of the teleprinter at SRI International (then Stanford Research Institute).

External links
 Official Weitbrecht Communications website

References

University spin-offs
Deaf culture in the United States
Technology companies based in Greater Los Angeles
Companies based in Santa Monica, California
Technology companies established in 1965
1965 establishments in California